Kanal 5 (Channel 5) is a Swedish television channel that was launched in 1989. It is owned by the US-based media company Warner Bros. Discovery, changing its ownership from ProSiebenSat.1 Media in April 2013.

After a troublesome 1990s, Kanal 5 launched new strategies in the early 2000s (decade) that established it as a popular entertainment channel targeting young people. The channel's slogan is "Roligare TV" ("More Entertaining TV") and it only broadcasts entertainment, such as series, movies, reality series and infotainment documentaries. In 2006, the channel was the most popular channel among Swedes aged 15–24.

History 
On 8 March 1989, businessman Matts Carlgren announced that he intended to start a new commercial television channel, as Jan Stenbeck had done with TV3. The channel was called Nordic Channel and launched on 27 March 1989.

The channel made heavy losses during its first years. In 1991, it was sold to Scandinavian Broadcasting System, headed by Harry E. Sloan, who had already bought Kanal 2 in Copenhagen and TV Norge in Norway. He renamed the channel TV5, but the French language TV5 complained and the channel had to be called TV5 Nordic. This was still in the early years of cable television and French TV5 still had widespread distribution in Swedish cable networks. TV5 Nordic finally had to drop its name in 1994, and became known as Femman ("The Five"). On 4 February 1996, the channel was named Kanal 5.

The Swedish version of Big Brother was launched in 2000 and ran for six seasons. Kanal 5 also had the rights for the American sitcom Friends. The last episode was broadcast on 15 December 2004, and attracted 965,000 viewers, one of the highest rated programmes in the channel's history. Kanal 5 is also involved in broadcasting the Olympic Games alongside sister channels Kanal 9 and Eurosport starting with PyeongChang 2018.

Programming

Swedish shows 
 100 höjdare
 Big Brother Sverige
 Boston Tea Party
 Café Bärs
 Ett herrans liv
 Fråga Olle
 Grattis världen
 High Chaparall
 Oumi
 Outsiders
 Partaj
 Roomservice
 So You Think You Can Dance Sweden
 Vakna med The Voice
 Veckans nyheter
 Welcome to Sweden
 Power of 10

Imported series, miniseries and children's shows 
 7th Heaven
 Airline
 Aliens in America
 America's Funniest Home Videos
 Balls of Steel
 Battlestar Galactica
 Beyond the Break
 Body of Proof
 Breaking the Magician's Code: Magic's Biggest Secrets Finally Revealed
 Brothers & Sisters
 Buffy the Vampire Slayer
 Charmed
 Cold Case
 Cougar Town
 Criminal Minds
 Criminal Minds: Suspect Behaviour
 CSI: Crime Scene Investigation
 CSI: Miami
 CSI: NY
 Denver, the Last Dinosaur
 Desperate Housewives
 Diagnosis: Murder
 Dirty Sexy Money
 Ellen
 Eleventh Hour
 ER
 Everwood
 Extreme Makeover
 Falcon Crest
 Fashion House
 Flashpoint
 Footballers' Wives
 Friday Night Lights
 Frasier
 Freddie
 Friends
 Fringe
 Full House
 Gary Unmarried
 GCB
 Gilmore Girls
 Gossip Girl
 Greek
 Grey's Anatomy
 Happy Endings
 Hart of Dixie
 Hellcats
 High School Reunion
 Histeria!
 Home and Away
 How to Get Away with Murder
 Human Target
 Invasion
 Jail
 Jerseylicious
 Jimmy Kimmel Live!
 Joey
 Justice
 Kevin Hill
 Keeping Up with the Kardashians
 Kim Possible
 Kyle XY
 Ladette to Lady
 Las Vegas
 Last Man Standing
 Law & Order: Criminal Intent
 Law & Order: Special Victims Unit
 Law & Order: Trial by Jury
 Lewis
 Live from Abbey Road
 Lizzie McGuire
 MacGyver
 Mad Men
 Magnum, P.I.
 McLeod's Daughters
 Mike & Molly
 Missing
 Mr. Bean
 Nikita
 Nip/Tuck
 No Ordinary Family
 Off the Map
 Oggy and the Cockroaches
 Once Upon a Time
 One Tree Hill
 Pineapple Dance Studios
 Prime Suspect
 Privileged
 Providence
 Psych
 Ramsay's Kitchen Nightmares
 Reaper
 Rizzoli & Isles
 Rome
 Rules of Engagement
 Sabrina the Teenage Witch
 Saturday Night Live
 Secret Diary of a Call Girl
 Seinfeld
 Shear Genius
 Skins
 Sonny with a Chance
 Supernatural
 The Sylvester and Tweety Mysteries
 Terminator: The Sarah Connor Chronicles
 The Bachelor
 The Bachelorette
 The Big Bang Theory
 The Biggest Loser
 The Biggest Loser Australia
 The Buried Life
 The Catherine Tate Show
 The Cleveland Show
 The Ellen DeGeneres Show
 The F Word
 The Forgotten
 The Fresh Prince of Bel-Air
 The Jay Leno Show
 The Life & Times of Tim
 The Middle
 The New Adventures of Old Christine
 The O.C.
 The Office
 The Real Housewives
 The River
 The Simpsons
 The Starter Wife The War at Home The X-Files Third Watch Top Gear Traveler Trinny & Susannah Undress... Two and a Half Men Ugly Betty What Not to Wear Wipeout Wizards of Waverly Place''

References

External links 
 
 Kanal 5 Play

Television channels in Sweden
Warner Bros. Discovery networks
1989 establishments in Sweden
Television channels and stations established in 1989
Warner Bros. Discovery EMEA